The 2011–12 División de Honor de Hockey Hierba was the 46th season of the División de Honor de Hockey Hierba, the highest field hockey league in Spain. The season began on 25 September 2011 and concluded on 29 April 2012.

Competition

Format
The División de Honor season takes place between September and April, and it divides into two phases. In the first phase every team playing each other once for a total of 11 matches. Upon completion of the first phase, the standings split into two groups of 6 teams each one. In group A, the top team wins the championship. In group B, the two bottom teams are relegated. Points are awarded according to the following:
2 points for a win
1 point for a draw

Upon completion of the second phase, the top team from group A become champions.

Promotion and relegation
Upon completion, the second phase, the two bottom teams from group B are relegated to División de Honor B, while the two top teams from División de Honor B are promoted.

Teams

Number of teams by autonomous community

Regular season

League table

Results

Championship round

League table

Results

Relegation round

League table

Results

Top goalscorers

External links
Official website

División de Honor de Hockey Hierba
Spain
field hockey
field hockey